Coil or COIL may refer to:

Geometry
 Helix
 Spiral

Science and technology
 Coil (chemistry), a tube used to cool and condense steam from a distillation
 Coil spring, used to store energy, absorb shock, or maintain a force between two surfaces
 Inductor or coil, a passive two-terminal electrical component
 Electromagnetic coil, formed when a conductor is wound around a core or form to create an inductor or electromagnet
 Induction coil, a type of electrical transformer used to produce high-voltage pulses from a low-voltage direct current supply
 Ignition coil, used in internal combustion engines to create a pulse of high voltage for a spark plug
 Intrauterine device or coil, a contraceptive device
 Chemical oxygen iodine laser
 Coil, a binary digit or bit in some communication protocols such as Modbus
 COIL, the gene that encodes the protein coilin
 Coiled tubing

Music
 Coil (band), an English experimental band
 Coil (album), a 1997 album by Toad the Wet Sprocket
 "Coil", a song by Opeth from Watershed

Fictional entities
 The Coil, a fictional organization in the G.I. Joe universe
 Magnemite or Coil, a Pokémon character
 Coil, a crime lord from the web serial Worm

People with the surname
 Liam Mac Cóil, Irish novelist

Other uses
 Coil (hieroglyph), an Egyptian hieratic hieroglyph
 Coiled basketry
 Coiling (pottery), a method of creating pottery
 Coil (video game), a video game by Edmund McMillen and Florian Himsl
 Turmoil or burden, as in mortal coil
 Coiling, a method for storing rope or cable

See also
 Helix (disambiguation)
 Loop (disambiguation)
 Spiral (disambiguation)